In enzymology, a guanosine-diphosphatase is an enzyme that catalyzes the chemical reaction

GDP + H2O  GMP + phosphate

Thus, the two substrates of this enzyme are GDP and H2O, whereas its two products are GMP and phosphate.

This enzyme belongs to the family of hydrolases, specifically those acting on acid anhydrides in phosphorus-containing anhydrides.  The systematic name of this enzyme class is GDP phosphohydrolase. This enzyme is also called GDPase.

References

 

EC 3.6.1
Enzymes of unknown structure